Saussurea gossypiphora commonly known as snowball plant (Hindi:कस्तूरी कमल, kastūrī kamal; Nepali:कपासे फूल, kapāsē phūl) is a perennial herbaceous plant. It is reputed to have medicinal properties according to traditional Chinese medicine. It is native to the Himalayas, and found at altitudes of 4300–5600 m.

References

gossypiphora
Flora of Nepal
Flora of China
Plants described in 1831

ne:कपासे